Tomoyoshi is a masculine Japanese given name.

Possible writings
Tomoyoshi can be written using many different combinations of kanji characters. Some examples:

友義, "friend, justice"
友吉, "friend, good luck"
友善, "friend, virtuous"
友芳, "friend, virtuous/fragrant"
友良, "friend, good"
友慶, "friend, congratulate"
友嘉, "friend, excellent"
友好, "friend, good/like something"
友能, "friend, capacity"
友佳, "friend, excellent"
知義, "know, justice"
知吉, "know, good luck"
知善, "know, virtuous"
知芳, "know, virtuous/fragrant"
知良, "know, good"
智義, "intellect, justice"
智吉, "intellect, good luck"
智善, "intellect, virtuous"
共吉, "together, good luck"
朋能, "companion, capacity"
朝義, "morning/dynasty, justice"
朝吉, "morning/dynasty, good luck"
朝良, "morning/dynasty, good"

The name can also be written in hiragana ともよし or katakana トモヨシ.

Notable people with the name
, Japanese water polo player
, Japanese footballer and manager
, Japanese motorcycle racer
, Japanese artist and playwright
, Japanese footballer
, Meiji period politician, civil rights activist
, Japanese footballer
, Japanese politician

Japanese masculine given names